Sam Skinner may refer to:

 Samuel K. Skinner (born 1938), American politician, lawyer, and businessman
 Sam Skinner (footballer) (born 1997), Australian rules footballer
 Sam Skinner (rugby union) (born 1994), English rugby union player